Johnny Zito (born John-Paul Zito 1982) is a writer, film maker and artist best known for horror comedy Alpha Girls.

Early life
Johnny Zito is a native of Philadelphia and graduated from Saint Joseph's Preparatory School in 2000. Afterwards, he attended Temple University obtaining degrees in Film, New Media and Theology.

Career
Zito's early career began in print with political cartoons. Most notably for Review Publishing.

In 2008, along with co-writer Tony Trov, he won the March Zuda Comics competition with The Black Cherry Bombshells. The duo's sophomore effort, La Morté Sisters, was also purchased by Zuda Comics in 2009. Both comics were nominated for Harvey Awards in the Best Online Comic Category; 2009 and 2011 respectively.

When Zuda Comics dissolved in 2010, The Black Cherry Bombshells and La Morté Sisters were migrated to the DC Online imprint along with several other popular titles.

In 2009, Zito and Trov teamed with Comixology to digitally distribute a mini-series based on their self-published comic Carnivale De Robotique.
Zito and Trov's webcomic based on the public domain character Moon Girl was digitally distributed through Comixology before being printed by Red 5 Comics in Spring of 2011. In 2010 they began digitally distributing a space-horror webcomic D.O.G.S. of Mars through Comixology. This webcomic was adapted in graphic novel form by Image Comics in 2011, and has been optioned as a film by High Treason Pictures.

Zito and Trov's production company, South Fellini, released their first feature film, Alpha Girls, in 2013 through Gravitas Ventures. In 2015, production began on a second feature film, American Exorcist. Zito has also designed T-shirts for Shirt.Woot, CBS, and Philadelphia's CheeseSteak Tees.

Comics
DC Entertainment:
The Black Cherry Bombshells (2008- 2011)
La Morté Sisters (2009- 2011)

Comixology
Carnivale De Robotique (2010)

Red 5 Comics
Moon Girl (2011- 2013)

Image Comics
D.O.G.S. of Mars (2012)

Films
 Alpha Girls – 2013 
 American Exorcist – 2018

Awards
 2009:
 Harvey Award Nominee - Best Online Comics Work for The Black Cherry Bombshells
 48 Hour Film Project - Best Editing, Best Special Effects for The Kingpin of Pain
 Finalist Set In Philadelphia Screenplay Film.org for La Morté Sisters
 CBS Star Trek T-Shirt Design Competition - First place design;

References

External links
 

American comics writers
American comics artists
American people of Italian descent
American writers of Italian descent
Living people
1982 births
American webcomic creators